Bush v. Gore, 531 U.S. 98 (2000), was a landmark decision of the United States Supreme Court on December 12, 2000, that settled a recount dispute in Florida's 2000 presidential election between George W. Bush and Al Gore. On December 8, the Florida Supreme Court had ordered a statewide recount of all undervotes, over 61,000 ballots that the vote tabulation machines had missed. The Bush campaign immediately asked the U.S. Supreme Court to stay the decision and halt the recount. Justice Antonin Scalia, convinced that all the manual recounts being performed in Florida's counties were illegitimate, urged his colleagues to grant the stay immediately. On December 9, the five conservative justices on the Court granted the stay for Bush, with Scalia citing "irreparable harm" that could befall Bush, as the recounts would cast "a needless and unjustified cloud" over Bush's legitimacy. In dissent, Justice John Paul Stevens wrote that "counting every legally cast vote cannot constitute irreparable harm."  Oral arguments were scheduled for December 11.

In a 5-4 per curiam decision, the Court ruled, strictly on equal protection grounds, that the recount be stopped. Specifically, the use of different standards of counting in different counties violated the Equal Protection Clause of the U.S. Constitution; the case had also been argued on the basis of Article II jurisdictional grounds, which found favor with only Justices Scalia, Clarence Thomas, and William Rehnquist. The Court then ruled as to a remedy, deciding against the remedy proposed by Justices Stephen Breyer and David Souter to send the case back to Florida to complete the recount using a uniform statewide standard before the scheduled December 18 meeting of Florida's electors in Tallahassee. Instead, the majority held that no alternative method could be established within the discretionary December 12 "safe harbor" deadline set by Title 3 of the United States Code (3 U.S.C.), which the Florida Supreme Court had stated that the Florida Legislature intended to meet. That deadline arrived two hours after the release of the Court's decision. The Court, stating that not meeting the "safe harbor" deadline would therefore violate the Florida Election Code, rejected an extension of the deadline.

The Supreme Court decision allowed the previous vote certification made by Florida Secretary of State, Katherine Harris, to stand for Bush, who thereby won Florida's 25 electoral votes. Florida's votes gave Bush, the Republican candidate, 271 electoral votes, one more than the 270 required to win the Electoral College. This meant the defeat of Democratic candidate Al Gore, who won 267 electoral votes but received 266, as a "faithless elector" from the District of Columbia abstained from voting. Media organizations later analyzed the ballots and found that, under specified criteria, the originally pursued recount of undervotes of several large counties would have confirmed a Bush victory, whereas a statewide recount would have revealed a Gore victory. Florida later retired the punch card voting machines that produced the ballots disputed in the case.

Background

In the United States, each state conducts its own popular vote election for president and vice president. The voters are actually voting for a slate of electors, each of whom pledges to vote for a particular candidate for each office, in the Electoral College. Article II, § 1, cl. 2 of the U.S. Constitution provides that each state legislature decides how electors are chosen. Referring to an earlier Supreme Court case, McPherson v. Blacker, the Court noted that early in U.S. history, most state legislatures directly appointed the slate of electors for each of their respective states.

Today, state legislatures have enacted laws to provide for the selection of electors by popular vote within each state. While these laws vary, most states, including Florida, award all electoral votes to the candidate for either office who receives a plurality of the state's popular vote. Any candidate who receives an absolute majority of all electoral votes nationally (270 since 1963) wins the presidential or vice presidential election.

On November 8, 2000, the Florida Division of Elections reported that Bush won with 48.8% of the vote in Florida, a margin of victory of 1,784 votes. The margin of victory was less than 0.5% of the votes cast, so a statutorily-mandated automatic machine recount occurred. On November 10, with the machine recount apparently finished in all but one county, Bush's margin of victory had decreased to 327 votes.

According to legal analyst Jeffrey Toobin, later analysis showed that a total of 18 counties—accounting for a quarter of all votes cast in Florida—did not carry out the legally mandated machine recount, but "No one from the Gore campaign ever challenged this view" that the machine recount had been completed. Florida's election laws allow a candidate to request a county to conduct a manual recount, and Gore requested manual recounts in four Florida counties: Volusia, Palm Beach, Broward, and Miami-Dade, which are counties that traditionally vote Democratic and would be expected to garner more votes for Gore. Gore did not, however, request any recounts in counties that traditionally vote Republican. The four counties granted the request and began manual recounts. However, Florida law also required all counties to certify their election returns to the Florida secretary of state within seven days of the election; and several of the counties conducting manual recounts did not believe they could meet this deadline.

On November 14, the statutory deadline, the Florida Circuit Court ruled that the seven-day deadline was mandatory but that the counties could amend their returns at a later date. The court also ruled that the secretary of state, after "considering all attendant facts and circumstances," had discretion to include any late amended returns in the statewide certification. Before the 5 p.m. deadline on November 14, Volusia County had completed its manual recount and certified its results. At 5 p.m. on November 14, Florida Secretary of State Katherine Harris announced that she had received the certified returns from all 67 counties, while Palm Beach, Broward, and Miami-Dade counties were still conducting manual recounts.

Harris issued a set of criteria by which she would determine whether to allow late filings, and she required any county seeking to make a late filing to submit to her, by 2 p.m. the following day, a written statement of the facts and circumstances justifying the late filing. Four counties submitted statements, and after reviewing the submissions, Harris determined that none justified an extension of the filing deadline. She further announced that after she received the certified returns of the overseas absentee ballots from each county, she would certify the results of the presidential election on November 18. However, on November 17, the Florida Supreme Court enjoined Harris from certifying the election while it heard appeals from the various cases in progress. On November 21, it allowed continuation of the manual recounts and delayed certification until November 26.

Stay of the Florida recount

By December 8, 2000, there had been multiple court decisions regarding the presidential election in Florida. On that date the Florida Supreme Court, by a 4–3 vote, ordered a statewide manual recount of undervotes. On December 9, ruling in response to an emergency request by Bush, the U.S. Supreme Court stayed the recount. The Court also decided to treat Bush's application for relief as a petition for a writ of certiorari, granted that petition, requested briefing from the parties by 4 p.m. on December 10, and scheduled oral argument for the morning of December 11.

Although opinions are rarely issued in connection with grants of certiorari (a minimum of four of the nine justices must vote in favor of the grant), Justice Scalia filed an opinion concurring in the Court's decision, noting that "a brief response is necessary to [Justice Stevens's] dissent". According to Scalia,

Justice Stevens's dissenting opinion was joined by Justices Souter, Ginsburg, and Breyer. According to Stevens,

A number of legal scholars have agreed with the dissenters' argument that Bush failed to carry the "heavy burden" of demonstrating a "likelihood of irreparable harm".

Rapid developments
The oral argument in Bush v. Gore occurred on December 11. Theodore Olson, a Washington, D.C., lawyer, delivered Bush's oral argument. New York lawyer David Boies argued for Gore.

During the brief period when the U.S. Supreme Court was deliberating on Bush v. Gore, the Florida Supreme Court provided clarifications of its November 21 decision in Palm Beach County Canvassing Board v. Harris (Harris I), which the U.S. Supreme Court had requested on December 4 following arguments in the case of Bush v. Palm Beach County Canvassing Board. Because of the extraordinary nature and argued urgency of the case, the U.S. Supreme Court issued its opinion in Bush v. Gore on December 12, 2000, a day after hearing oral argument.

Relevant law

The Equal Protection Clause of the Fourteenth Amendment is the U.S. Constitutional provision on which the decision in Bush v. Gore was based.

Article II, § 1, cl. 2 of the Constitution specifies the number of electors per state, and, most relevant to this case, specifies the manner in which those electors are selected, stipulating that:

This clause arguably gives power to only one branch of Florida's state government (i.e., the state legislature).

Section 2 of the Electoral Count Act, now codified in 3 U.S.C. § 5, regulates the "determination of controversy as to appointment of electors" in presidential elections. Of particular relevance to this case was the so-called "safe harbor" provision, which assures Congress' deference to states in their appointments of electors if done by a specified deadline:

Since the electors were set to meet December 18, the discretional "safe harbor" deadline was December 12, just one day after the Court heard oral arguments in this case.

According to :

Issues considered by the Court
 The Court had to resolve two different questions to fully resolve the case:
Were the recounts, as they were being conducted, constitutional?
If the recounts were unconstitutional, what was the appropriate remedy?

Three days earlier, the five-Justice majority had ordered the recount stopped, and the Court had to decide whether to restart it.

Equal Protection Clause
Bush argued that recounts in Florida violated the Equal Protection Clause because Florida did not have a statewide vote recount standard. Each county was on its own to determine whether a given ballot was an acceptable one. Two voters could have marked their ballots in an identical manner, but the ballot in one county would be counted while the ballot in a different county would be rejected, because of the conflicting manual recount standards.

Gore argued that there was indeed a statewide standard, the "intent of the voter" standard, and that this standard was sufficient under the Equal Protection Clause. Furthermore, Gore argued that the consequence of ruling the Florida recount unconstitutional simply because it treated different voters differently would effectively render every state election unconstitutional and that each voting mechanism has a different rate of error in counting votes. Voters in a "punch-card" county have a greater chance of having their votes undercounted than voters in an "optical scanner" county. If Bush prevails, Gore argued, every state would have to have one statewide method of recording votes to be constitutional.
This was the most closely decided issue in the case. The arguments presented by counsel did not extensively address what the Court should do if the Court were to find an equal protection violation. However, Gore did argue briefly that the appropriate remedy would not be to cancel all recounts, but rather would be to order a proper recount.

Article II
Bush also argued that the Florida Supreme Court's ruling violated Article II, § 1, cl. 2 of the U.S. Constitution. Essentially, Bush argued that the Florida Supreme Court's interpretation of Florida law was so erroneous that its ruling had the effect of making new law. Since this "new law" had not been directed by the Florida legislature, it violated Article II. Bush argued that Article II gives the federal judiciary the power to interpret state election law in presidential elections to ensure that the intent of the state legislature is followed.

Gore argued that Article II presupposes judicial review and interpretation of state statutes, and that the Florida Supreme Court did nothing more than exercise the routine principles of statutory construction to reach its decision.

Decision
In brief, the breakdown of the decision was:
Five justices agreed that there was an Equal Protection Clause violation in using differing standards of determining a valid vote in different counties, causing an "unequal evaluation of ballots in various respects". The per curiam opinion (representing the views of Justices Kennedy, O'Connor, Rehnquist, Scalia, and Thomas) specifically cited that:
 Palm Beach County changed standards for counting dimpled chads several times during the counting process;
 Broward County used less restrictive standards than Palm Beach County;
 Miami-Dade County's recount of rejected ballots did not include all precincts;
 The Florida Supreme Court did not specify who would recount the ballots.
The per curiam opinion also identified an inconsistency with the fact that the Florida statewide recount of rejected ballots was limited to undervotes. The opinion implied that a constitutionally valid recount would include not only Florida's undervotes, but also its overvotes. The per curiam expressed concern that the limited scope of Florida’s recount would mean that, unlike some undervotes found to be reclaimable, valid votes among the overvotes would not be reclaimed. Furthermore, if a machine incorrectly reads an overvote as a valid vote for one of two marked candidates instead of rejecting it, Florida would wrongly count what should be an invalid vote.

Justices Breyer and Souter disagreed with the majority, pointing out that Bush presented no evidence in any court of legal overvotes uncounted and did not see any problem in Florida's decision to limit its recount to undervotes. The dissents of Breyer and Souter were full dissents. Unlike the five-justice majority, each identified an equal protection concern that did not rise to the level of a constitutional violation, and they proposed a remedy altogether different from the majority’s remedy. A dissenting opinion does not create precedent nor does it become a part of case law. Under the American legal system, dissenting court opinions are not considered valid holdings and are not included in the court's ruling. Nothing in Breyer's or Souter's dissents can be construed as being part of any decision by the majority justices.

In dissenting, Justice Ginsburg wrote that, for better or worse, disparities were a part of all elections and that if an equal-protection argument applied in any way, it surely applied more to black voters.
Five justices agreed that December 12 (the date of the decision) was the deadline Florida had established for recounts in keeping with 3 U.S.C. §5 (Rehnquist, O'Connor, Scalia, Kennedy, and Thomas in support; Stevens, Souter, Ginsburg, and Breyer opposed). Souter, joined by Breyer, Ginsburg and Stevens, said, "But no State is required to conform to §5 if it cannot do that (for whatever reason); the sanction for failing to satisfy the conditions of §5 is simply loss of what has been  called its 'safe harbor.' And even that determination is to be made, if made anywhere, in the Congress." Justices Souter and Breyer wanted to remand the case to the Florida Supreme Court to permit that court to establish uniform standards of what constituted a legal vote for a manual recount of all rejected ballots using those standards. 
Three justices (Rehnquist, Scalia and Thomas) argued that the Florida Supreme Court had acted contrary to the intent of the Florida legislature. Four justices (Stevens, Souter, Ginsburg and Breyer) specifically disputed this in their dissenting opinions, and the remaining two Justices (O'Connor and Kennedy) declined to join Rehnquist's concurrence on the matter.

Equal Protection Clause
The Supreme Court, in a per curiam opinion, ruled that the Florida Supreme Court's decision, calling for a statewide recount, violated the Equal Protection Clause of the Fourteenth Amendment. Kennedy has since been identified as the primary author of the opinion. In addition to writing the opinion, Kennedy also decided to include Souter, Breyer and Stevens as agreeing that there were equal protection "problems" without consulting them. Stevens demanded his name be removed from the draft opinion, which Kennedy agreed to only after Stevens pulled his name from Breyer's dissent. Breyer also objected in private. The New York Times reported that Kennedy's opinion "later caused some confusion by its reference to 'seven justices of the court' who 'agree that there are constitutional problems with the recount.' That was true, but it was also beside the point." Later interviews by Vanity Fair indicated that Breyer and Souter were trying to appeal to Kennedy to join them on the remedy, rather than actually agreeing that an equal protection violation had occurred. Jack Balkin, writing in Yale Law Journal, considered this to be a cheap trick to construct the illusion of a larger majority, likening it to "saying that two doctors agree that a patient is sick, but one wants to use leeches, and the other wants to prescribe antibiotics".

The Court held that the Equal Protection Clause guarantees to individuals that their ballots cannot be devalued by "later arbitrary and disparate treatment". Even if the recount was fair in theory, it was unfair in practice. The record, as weighed by the Florida Supreme Court, suggested that different standards were seemingly applied to the recount from ballot to ballot, precinct to precinct, and county to county, even when identical types of ballots and machines were used.

According to the Court, the statewide standard (that a "legal vote" is "one in which there is a 'clear indication of the intent of the voter'") could not guarantee that each county would count the votes in a constitutionally permissible fashion. The Court stated that the per curiam opinion's applicability was "limited to the present circumstances, for the problem of equal protection in election processes generally presents many complexities." However, the Court did not state what those complexities were, nor did it explain (or apparently consider) why the absence of a constitutionally acceptable standard for counting votes, which was the basis for the Court's ruling, would not have invalidated the entire presidential election in Florida.

Critics would later point out that the court had denied certiorari on equal protection grounds when Bush first sought Supreme Court review. Law clerks who worked for Kennedy and O'Connor at the time would later state their belief that the justices settled on equal protection as grounds for their decision, rather than Article II, because they thought it would seem more fair.

Remedy
The Court ruled 5–4 that no constitutionally valid recount could be completed by a December 12 "safe harbor" deadline. The Court therefore effectively ended the proposed recount, because "the Florida Legislature intended to obtain the safe-harbor benefits of 3 U.S.C. §5." Souter said bluntly, "The 3 U.S.C. §5 issue is not serious." Breyer's dissent stated, "By halting the manual recount, and thus ensuring that uncounted legal votes will not be counted under any standard, this Court crafts a remedy out of proportion to the asserted harm. And that remedy harms the very fairness interests the Court is attempting to protect."

Four justices (Stevens, Ginsburg, Souter and Breyer) had dissented from the Court's earlier (December 9) decision, by the same five-justice majority, to grant Bush's emergency request to stop the recount and grant certiorari. In their dissents from the Court's December 12 per curiam opinion, Breyer and Souter acknowledged that the counting up until December 9 had not conformed with equal protection requirements. However, Souter and Breyer favored remanding the case to the Florida Supreme Court for the purpose of crafting specific guidelines for how to count disputed ballots, in contrast to the majority's decision to halt the recount altogether. The actual counting had ended with the December 9 ruling, issued three days before any deadline.

The dissenting opinions strongly criticized the five-justice majority for involving the Court in state-level affairs. Justice Stevens's dissent (joined by Justices Breyer and Ginsburg) concluded as follows:

The per curiam opinion did not technically dismiss the case and instead "remanded for further proceedings not inconsistent with this opinion." Gore's attorneys therefore understood that they could fight on and could petition the Florida Supreme Court to repudiate the notion that December 12 was final under Florida law.

Despite this, Gore dropped the case – and conceded the 2000 United States presidential election to George W. Bush shortly afterward – reportedly because he was not optimistic about how the Florida justices would react to further arguments and, as one of his advisers put it, "the best Gore could hope for was a slate of disputed electors." In addition, Gore campaign chairman Bill Daley argued that fighting on was futile because even if the Florida Supreme Court defied the U.S. Supreme Court and ordered a new recount, "the GOP would take them straight back to Washington, where the [U.S.] Supreme Court would repeat: 'You ain't going to count, okay? So quit bothering us.'"

On remand, the Florida Supreme Court issued an opinion on December 22 that did not dispute whether December 12 was the deadline for recounts under state law, although this was disputed in a concurring opinion by Florida Supreme Court Justice Leander Shaw who nevertheless expressed deference to the U.S. Supreme Court's view on this issue and who also argued that, in any case, the Florida Supreme Court would (in his opinion) be unable to craft a remedy which would satisfy all of the U.S. Supreme Court's equal protection, due process, and other concerns.

Article II
Chief Justice Rehnquist's concurring opinion, joined by Justices Scalia and Thomas, began by emphasizing that this was an unusual case in which the Constitution requires federal courts to assess whether a state supreme court has properly interpreted the will of the state legislature. Usually, federal courts do not make that type of assessment, and indeed the per curiam opinion in this case did not do so. After addressing this aspect of the case, Rehnquist examined and agreed with arguments that had been made by the dissenting justices of the Florida Supreme Court.

Rehnquist also mentioned that he, along with Justices Scalia and Thomas, joined the Supreme Court's per curiam opinion and agreed with the legal analysis that was presented there.

The ruling also states "the state legislature's power to select the manner for appointing electors is plenary; it may, if it so chooses, select the electors itself, which indeed was the manner used by state legislatures in several States for many years after the framing of our Constitution. ... The State, of course, after granting the franchise in the special context of Article II, can take back the power to appoint electors."

Scholarly analyses
Bush v. Gore prompted many strong reactions from scholars, pundits and others regarding the Court's decision, with a majority of publications in law reviews being critical. An analysis in The Georgetown Law Journal found that 78 scholarly articles were published about the case between 2001 and 2004, with 35 criticizing the decision and 11 defending it.

The critical remedial issue
The most closely decided aspect of the case was the key question of what remedy the Court should order, in view of an Equal Protection Clause violation. Gore had argued for a new recount that would pass constitutional muster, but the Court instead chose to end the election. Citing two Florida Supreme Court opinions, Gore v. Harris (December 8, seemingly in error) and Palm Beach County Canvassing Board v. Harris (November 21, footnote 55), the U.S. Supreme Court asserted that "the Florida Supreme Court has said that the Florida Legislature intended to obtain the safe-harbor benefits of 3 U.S.C. § 5" and that "any recount seeking to meet the December 12 date will be unconstitutional." This assertion has proven very controversial.

Finding that reasoning not to be persuasive, Michael W. McConnell writes that the two Florida court opinions cited by the Supreme Court supply no authoritative pronouncement of an absolute deadline. As better support for December 12 being the deadline under state law, McConnell points to two footnotes in the Florida Supreme Court's December 11 response on remand in Palm Beach County Canvassing Board v. Harris (Harris I), which he says must not have come to the justices' attention. Footnotes 17 and 22 characterized the safe harbor date of December 12 as an "outside deadline." Therefore, he writes, although these passages may not justify the U.S Supreme Court's decision, since the Court did not rely on them, "the Court may have reached the right result for the wrong reason." These footnotes state:

According to Nelson Lund, former law clerk to Justice O'Connor and associate counsel to George H. W. Bush, a dissenter might argue that the Florida Supreme Court on remand in Harris I was discussing the "protest provisions of the Florida Election Code, whereas the issues in Bush v. Gore arose under the contest provisions." In retort to himself, Lund writes that the Florida court's decision in the contest case did not mention any alternative possible deadlines. Peter Berkowitz writes, "Perhaps it would have been more generous for the Court to have asked the Florida court on remand whether 'outside deadline' referred to contest-period as well as protest-period recounts." Abner Greene points to evidence that "the Florida Supreme Court thought all manual recounts – whether protest or contest – must be completed no later than December 12." Nevertheless, Greene concludes "lack of clarity about the Florida Supreme Court's views on the safe-harbor provision should have resulted in a remand to that court for clarification," in addition to the remand of December 4. The Court in Bush v. Gore did remand the case instead of dismissing it, but the remand did not include another request for clarification. Louise Weinberg argues that even giving the U.S. Supreme Court the benefit of the doubt that it acted appropriately in intervening in Florida state law, its actions should be deemed unconstitutional because its intervention was not coupled with any kind of remedy aimed at determining the actual outcome of the election.

Arguably, the Florida Supreme Court, after having stated on December 11 that December 12 was an "outside deadline", could have clarified its views on the safe-harbor provision or reinterpreted Florida law to state that December 12 was not a final deadline under Florida law, which the United States Supreme Court did not forbid the Florida Supreme Court from doing. Lund states that, as a practical matter, the Florida Supreme Court was unlikely to have actually been capable of conducting and completing a new constitutionally valid recount by the December 18, 2000 deadline for the meeting of the Electoral College.

Michael Abramowicz and Maxwell Stearns further argue that if the Florida Supreme Court had clarified or reinterpreted Florida state law on remand, then the United States Supreme Court might have struck down the Florida Supreme Court's action as being a violation of Article II of the United States Constitution. Abramowicz and Stearns point out that while Justices Anthony Kennedy and Sandra Day O'Connor did not join Chief Justice William Rehnquist's Article II concurrence, they did not explicitly oppose this concurrence either and thus kept the door open to nullifying a future ruling of the Florida Supreme Court on Article II grounds. Abramowicz and Stearns also argue that if the Bush v. Gore per curiam opinion genuinely allowed the Florida Supreme Court to clarify or reinterpret Florida state law and to thus order a new Florida manual recount, then Justices David Souter and Stephen Breyer likely would have joined the Bush v. Gore per curiam opinion–which they had not done. Laurence Tribe has a similar view on this issue, arguing that "[e]ven assuming the leeway [in regard to the remedy] the Court theoretically left open was real, the window it had failed to slam shut was hardly the sort of opening through which anyone would dare to crawl."

Limitation to present circumstances
Some critics of the decision argue that the majority seemed to seek refuge from their own logic in the following sentence in the majority opinion: "Our consideration is limited to the present circumstances, for the problem of equal protection in election processes generally presents many complexities." The Court's defenders argued that this was a reasonable precaution against the possibility that the decision might be read over-broadly, arguing that in the short time available it would not be appropriate to attempt to craft language spelling out in greater detail how to apply the holding to other cases. Critics, however, interpreted the sentence as stating that the case did not set precedent in any way and could not be used to justify any future court decision, and some suggested that this was evidence the majority realized its holding was untenable. Regardless of whether the majority intended the decision to be precedential, it has been cited by several federal courts in election cases, as well as by a lawyer for a Republican congressional candidate during legal arguments coincident with the 2020 United States Presidential Election.

Accusation of partisanship or conflict of interest
According to legal analyst Jeffrey Toobin, "Bush v. Gore broke David Souter's heart. The day the music died, he called it. It was so political, so transparently political, that it scarred Souter's belief in the Supreme Court as an institution." (emphasis in original)

Various authors have claimed that conservative Republican-appointed justices ruled against Gore in this case for partisan reasons. Harvard University law professor Alan Dershowitz writes:

Chapman University School of Law professor Ronald Rotunda responded that Democratic-appointed justices of the Florida Supreme Court also ruled against Gore:

There has also been analysis of whether several justices had a conflict of interest that should have forced them to recuse themselves from the decision. On several occasions, Rehnquist had expressed interest in retiring under a Republican administration; one study found that press reports "are equivocal on whether facts existed that would have created a conflict of interest" for Rehnquist. At an election night party, O'Connor became upset when the media initially announced that Gore had won Florida, her husband explaining that they would have to wait another four years before retiring to Arizona. Both justices remained on the Court beyond President Bush's first term, until Rehnquist's death in 2005 and O'Connor's retirement in 2006. According to Steven Foster of the Manchester Grammar School:

The day after Thanksgiving, when the conservative justices agreed to hear Bush's appeal in the case of Bush v. Palm Beach County Canvassing Board (excluding Bush's equal protection claim), the opposing justices were convinced that the majority intended to reverse the Florida Supreme Court and shut down the recount. They began drafting a dissent before this case was argued before them, a dissent that was temporarily shelved upon the Court's unanimous remand to the Florida court.

The liberal law clerks noted Justice Scalia later had begun campaigning for the stay of the Florida court's December 8 recount order before the Court had received Gore's response to Bush's request and was so incensed at Stevens's dissent in the matter of the stay and grant of certiorari, that he requested the release of opinions be delayed so that he could amend his opinion to include a response to Stevens. Kennedy is also reported to have sent out a memo which accused the dissenters of "trashing the court". Later, court personnel, as well as Ron Klain, speculated that there was an unspoken understanding that the judges on the winning side would not retire until after the next election, as a way of preserving some sense of fairness. Indeed, no Supreme Court justices retired during President Bush's first term.

It has been argued that none of the justices ended up voting in a way that was consistent with their prior legal jurisprudence, though this conclusion has been challenged by George Mason University law professor Nelson Lund (who argues that, unlike in suspect classification cases, the United States Supreme Court has never actually required a showing of intentional discrimination in fundamental rights cases, such as Bush v. Gore itself). The five conservative justices decided to involve the federal judiciary in a matter that could have been left to the states, while also expanding the previous US Supreme Court interpretations of the Equal Protection Clause. Meanwhile, the liberal justices all supported leaving the matter in the hands of a state and also sometimes advocated in favor of a narrower reading of existing Equal Protection Clause SCOTUS precedents. This increased the perceptions that the judges used their desired results to drive their reasoning, instead of using legal reasoning to arrive at a result. David Cole of Georgetown Law argued that, as a way of trying to rehabilitate the court's image after Bush v. Gore, the court became more likely to reach a liberal decision in the four years after Bush v. Gore than they had been before the case, and that the conservative justices were more likely to join the liberals rather than the other way around.

Recount by media organizations
In 2001, the National Opinion Research Center (NORC) at the University of Chicago, sponsored by a consortium of major United States news organizations, conducted the Florida Ballot Project, a comprehensive review of 175,010 ballots that vote-counting machines had rejected from the entire state, not just the disputed counties that were recounted. The project's goal was to determine the reliability and accuracy of the systems used in the voting process, including how different systems correlated with voter mistakes. The study was conducted over a period of 10 months. Based on the review, the media group concluded that if the disputes over the validity of all the ballots in question had been consistently resolved and any uniform standard applied, the electoral result would have been reversed and Gore would have won by 60 to 171 votes. On the other hand, under scenarios involving review of limited sets of ballots uncounted by machines, Bush would have kept his lead. In one such scenario — Al Gore's request for recounts in four predominantly Democratic counties — Bush would have won by 225 votes. In another scenario (if the remaining 64 Florida counties had carried out the hand recount of disputed ballots ordered by the Florida Supreme Court on December 8, applying the various standards that county election officials said they would have used), Bush would have emerged the victor by 493 votes.

The scenarios involving limited sets of ballots included the completed uncertified recount by Palm Beach County, which nevertheless had excluded a set-aside cache of dimpled ballots with clear indications of intent, an uncounted net gain of 682 votes for Gore.  In contrast, the scenarios involving all uncounted ballots statewide considered all votes from Palm Beach County, subjected to various standards of inclusion. The Washington Post qualified the tallies conducted by the NORC consortium with the statement: "But no study of this type can accurately recreate Election Day 2000 or predict what might have emerged from individual battles over more than 6 million votes in Florida's 67 counties."

Further analysis revealed that black-majority precincts had three times as many rejected ballots as white precincts. "For minorities, the ballot survey found, a recount would not have redressed the inequities because most ballots were beyond retrieving. But a recount could have restored the votes of thousands of older voters whose dimpled and double-voted ballots were indecipherable to machines but would have been clear in a ballot-by-ballot review."

Critiques
Several subsequent articles have characterized the decision as damaging the reputation of the court, increasing the view of judges as partisan, and decreasing Americans' trust in the integrity of elections, an outcome predicted by Justice Stevens in his dissent. Part of the reason recounts could not be completed was the various stoppages ordered by the various branches and levels of the judiciary, most notably the Supreme Court. Opponents argued that it was improper for the Court (by the same five justices who joined the per curiam opinion) to grant a stay that preliminarily stopped the recounts based on Bush's likelihood of success on the merits and possible irreparable injury to Bush. Although stay orders normally do not include justification, Scalia concurred to express some brief reasoning to justify it, saying that one potential irreparable harm was that an invalid recount might undermine the legitimacy of Bush's election (presumably if, for example, it were to find that Gore should have won). Supporters of the stay, such as Charles Fried, contend that the validity of the stay was vindicated by the ultimate decision on the merits and that the only thing that the stay prevented was a recount "being done in an unconstitutional way."

Some critics argued that the Court's decision was a perversion of the Equal Protection Clause and contrary to the political question doctrine. Scott Lemieux of University of Washington points out that if recounting votes without a uniform statewide standard were truly a violation of the Equal Protection Clause, this should have meant that the initial count, which also lacked a uniform standard, was itself unconstitutional. On the other hand, Geoffrey R. Stone has expressed sympathy with the Court's equal protection reasoning, even though Stone was dismayed by what he saw as the sudden and suspect conversion of Justices Rehnquist, Scalia and Thomas to that equal protection principle. According to Stone:

Justice Stevens' criticism of the Court in his dissent for questioning the impartiality of Florida's judiciary was itself criticized by Lund, a former law clerk for Justice O'Connor. Professor Charles Zelden faults the per curiam opinion in the case for, among other things, not declaring that the nation's electoral system required significant reform, and for not condemning administration of elections by part-time boards of elections dominated by partisan and unprofessional officials. Zelden concludes that the Court's failure to spotlight this critical flaw in American electoral democracy made a replay of Bush v. Gore more likely, not less likely, either in Florida or elsewhere. In 2013, retired Justice O'Connor, who had voted with the majority, said that the case "gave the court a less-than-perfect reputation". She added, "Maybe the court should have said, 'We're not going to take it, goodbye.' ... And probably the Supreme Court added to the problem at the end of the day."

A subsequent article in Vanity Fair quotes several of the court's clerks at the time who were critical of the decision. They note that, despite the per curiam decision's declaration that the case was taken "reluctantly", Justice Kennedy had been rather enthusiastic about taking the case all along. They felt at the time, as had many legal scholars, that the case was unlikely to go to the Supreme Court at all. In fact some of the justices were so certain that the case would never come before them that they had already left for vacations.

Public reaction
Editorials in the country's leading newspapers were overwhelmingly critical of the decision. A review by The Georgetown Law Journal found that the nation's top newspapers, by circulation, had published 18 editorials criticizing the decision, compared with just 6 praising it. They similarly published 26 op-eds criticizing the decision, compared to just 8 defending the decision. Polls showed a range of reactions, with 37–65% of respondents believing that personal politics influenced the decision of the justices, depending on the poll. A Princeton Survey poll recorded 46% of respondents saying that the decision made them more likely to suspect the partisan bias of the judges in general. An NBC News/Wall Street Journal poll showed that 53% of respondents believed that the decision to stop the recount was based mostly on politics. A 2010 article in Slate listed the case as the first in a series of events that eroded American trust in the results of elections, noting that the number of lawsuits brought over election issues has more than doubled since Bush v. Gore.

See also
List of United States presidential elections by Electoral College margin
Electoral Commission (United States)
Supreme Injustice, a 2001 book by Alan Dershowitz
Unprecedented: The 2000 Presidential Election, a 2002 documentary
Recount, a 2008 HBO movie about the 2000 presidential election and Bush v. Gore
Post-election lawsuits related to the 2020 United States presidential election
2000 United States presidential election in popular culture

Notes and references

External links
 
 
After Bush v. Gore by Retro Report
Tony Sutin: Presidential Election Law
Peter Berkowitz & Benjamin Wittes: "The Lawfulness of the Election Decision"

Adam Cohen: "Has Bush v. Gore Become the Case That Must Not Be Named?", Editorial Observer, The New York Times, August 15, 2006.
Text and audio of U.S. Supreme Court oral arguments – Bush v. Gore
Video highlight of Florida Supreme Court Chief Justice Wells opening Gore v. Harris argument on November 20, 2000
Video highlights of November 20, 2000, and December 7, 2000, oral arguments in Gore v. Harris in front of Florida Supreme Court

United States Supreme Court cases
United States elections case law
United States equal protection case law
United States Supreme Court cases of the Rehnquist Court
2000 United States presidential election in Florida
2000 in United States case law
2000 controversies in the United States
George W. Bush 2000 presidential campaign
Al Gore 2000 presidential campaign